South Dakota Highway 100 (SD 100) is the designation of a future state highway that will be built south and east of Interstate 229 (I-229) as a second southeastern bypass of Sioux Falls. The highway will run from exit 73 on I-29 east and north to exit 402 on I-90. This highway is currently named Veterans Parkway on its route from Interstate 90 to 57th Street in Sioux Falls.

Route description 
SD 100 is expected to facilitate commercial and residential growth in the eastern section of the city of Sioux Falls. It will also serve as a second eastern bypass of the city, running roughly parallel to I-229 and about  outside of it.

As proposed, SD 100 will begin at the single-point urban interchange (SPUI) at exit 73 along I-29. It will run in a general northeasterly direction just outside of the southern extremities of Sioux Falls and enter the Sioux Falls city limits just west of its intersection with SD 115 (Minnesota Avenue). The route is to continue to the northeast past this intersection until it reaches what is now 69th Street; at that point, the route will curve to the east and follow that alignment. It will continue to follow 69th Street until east of an intersection with Sycamore Avenue, at which point it is to bend to the northeast. While heading northeast, the road will meet SD 11, and the two routes will together curve due north along Powder House Road. The road will meet 57th Street at a SPUI that is yet to be constructed and cross from Lincoln County into Minnehaha County.

After intersecting 57th Street, SD 100 and SD 11 will continue north to an intersection with SD 42 (Arrowhead Parkway). At this intersection, SD 11 will leave SD 100 and turn east along SD 42. SD 100 is to continue north of this intersection along Powder House Road until just south of Madison Street, where it will curve slightly to the northeast. The highway will continue northeast until intersecting a proposed extension of Benson Road at another SPUI. Here, the road will curve northwest to intersect Rice Street, then back to the north before crossing the Big Sioux River and intersecting 60th Street North. Just north of 60th Street North, SD 100 will end at what was previously a diamond interchange, but was upgraded to a SPUI, at exit 402 on I-90.

History 

Planning for a new southeastern bypass of Sioux Falls began in the 1990s, when community members collaborated with officials from the City of Sioux Falls and South Dakota Department of Transportation. Construction of the first segment of Highway 100, extending from just south of South Dakota Highway 42/Arrowhead Parkway southward to 26th Street. The rest of the eastern half of Highway 100, extending from 57th Street northward to Interstate 90, was constructed in phases over ten years. The last segment of this stretch, extending from Rice Street across the Big Sioux River to Interstate 90, opened to traffic in December 2020.

Major intersections

See also

References

External links

100
Transportation in Lincoln County, South Dakota
Transportation in Minnehaha County, South Dakota
Transportation in Sioux Falls, South Dakota
Proposed state highways in the United States